Tomáš Šimkovič (born 16 April 1987) was an Austrian footballer who plays as a midfielder for Latvian club RFS.

Career
On 1 February 2014, Šimkovič signed a two-year contract with Kazakhstan Premier League side FC Tobol.

On 17 June 2017, Šimkovič signed for FC Aktobe, signing for FK Žalgiris on 3 February 2018.

In February 2019, Šimkovič joined Rīgas FS in Latvia.

In January 2022 he joined Austrian club First Vienna FC.

Career statistics

Club

Honours
Individual
A Lyga Team of the Year: 2018
 A Lyga Player of the Month: September & October 2018

References

External links
 Guardian Football

1987 births
Living people
Austrian footballers
Slovak footballers
Austria youth international footballers
Association football midfielders
Austrian people of Slovak descent
Footballers from Bratislava
Austrian Football Bundesliga players
Kazakhstan Premier League players
A Lyga players
Latvian Higher League players
SC Schwanenstadt players
SC Wiener Neustadt players
FK Austria Wien players
FC Tobol players
FK Žalgiris players
FK RFS players
Austrian expatriate footballers
Expatriate footballers in Kazakhstan
Austrian expatriate sportspeople in Kazakhstan
Expatriate footballers in Lithuania
Austrian expatriate sportspeople in Lithuania
Expatriate footballers in Latvia
Austrian expatriate sportspeople in Latvia